Hallanvaara (Finnish for Risk of Frost) is the third studio album of Ismo Alanko Säätiö. Ismo Alanko composed the music and asked different people to provide the arrangements for the album. In addition to Säätiö personnel, the album features two string ensembles: Arttu Takalon Jouset (Arttu Takalo's Strings) and Ville Kankaan Jousikvartetti (Ville Kangas' String Quartet).

Kimmo Pohjonen, who had already left the band before the recording of Hallanvaara, plays accordion on "Peilikuva".

Track listing 
All compositions by Ismo Alanko except "Töiden jälkeen" by Alanko and Arttu Takalo. All lyrics by Alanko.

"Risteys" (arr. Takalo) -- 4:18
"Suurenmoinen ruumissaatto" (arr. Riku Mattila, Valtteri Tynkkynen) -- 4:55
"Maailmanparantaja" (arr. Alanko, Samuli Laiho, Marko Timonen) -- 5:26
"Nurkkapöytä" [instrumental] (arr. Laiho) -- 0:48
"Kukaan ei tunne mua" (arr. Ahti Marja-Aho) -- 4:29
"Pieni itsemurha" (arr. Alanko) -- 3:26
"Paratiisin puu" (arr. Tynkkynen, Timonen) -- 3:54
"Kadonnut suudelma" (arr. Alanko) -- 4:22
"Pojanmaa" (arr. Alanko, Laiho, Timonen) -- 4:10
"Kullankaivajat" (arr. Alanko, Ville Kangas, Timonen) -- 5:07
"Tulessamakaaja" (arr. Alanko, Laiho)-- 1:14
"Peilikuva" (arr. Alanko, Safka Pekkonen, Timonen) -- 5:12
"Töiden jälkeen" [instrumental] (arr. Takalo) -- 2:05
"Hallanvaara" (arr. Marja-Aho) -- 4:07

Personnel

Ismo Alanko Säätiö 
Ismo Alanko -- vocals, piano, cello, guitar, electric piano, whistling
Samuli Laiho—acoustic guitar, backing vocals
Jarno Karjalainen -- bass guitar, double bass
Marko Timonen -- drums, percussion

Arttu Takalon Jouset 
Arttu Takalo -- conductor
Katariina Junnila-Kaikkonen -- violin
Kati Kiraly—violin
Maija Linkola—violin
Eriikka Maalismaa—violin
Reeta Maalismaa—violin
Anna Tanskanen—violin
Inkeri Vänskä—violin
Janne Ahvenainen -- viola
Lotta Poijärvi—viola
Päivi Ahonen—cello
Ville Turunen—cello
Marko Mikkola—double bass

Ville Kankaan Jousikvartetti 
Ville Kangas—violin
Anni Järvelä—violin
Sanna-Mari Helen—viola
Osmo Ikonen—cello

Session musicians 
Ilkka Alanko—backing vocals
Anni Haapaniemi -- oboe
Jukka Hakoköngäs—piano
Juhani Hapuli -- Thai gong, celesta
Erja Joukamo-Ampuja -- French horn
Seppo Kantonen—piano, electric piano
Pentti Lahti -- piccolo, flute, bass flute, tenor and alto saxophone, clarinet, bass clarinet
Ahti Marja-Aho—piano
Riku Mattila—guitar, keyboards, sitar, glockenspiel
Puka Oinonen -- saw
Timo Paasonen -- flugelhorn, trumpet
Safka Pekkonen -- organ, electric piano, piano
Kimmo Pohjonen -- accordion
Erik Siikasaari—double bass

References 

2002 albums
Ismo Alanko Säätiö albums